High Falls State Park is a  Georgia state park located near the city of Jackson in Monroe County, Georgia, part of the Macon metropolitan area.  It is the site of a prosperous 19th-century industrial center, which became a ghost town when it was bypassed by the railroad. The park contains the largest waterfall in middle Georgia and a  lake.

History
In the early 19th century, the park's land was a prosperous industrial town with several stores, a grist mill, cotton gin, blacksmith shop, and shoe factory. However, the town, called High Falls, became a ghost town in the 1880s when it was bypassed by a major railroad. The remains of the bridge on Old Alabama Road still partially stand to offer views of the shoals below the dam. The bridge, constructed in 1890, was mostly destroyed in the flood of 1994. Historic hikes lead to the foundation of the old grist mill and ruins of the old powerhouse. The park contains a  lake.

Facilities
97 tent/trailer/RV Campsites
5 picnic shelters
1 Paddle-In Primitive Campsite
1 Group shelter
1 Pioneer Campground
Miniature golf course
Swimming pool

Annual events
Canoe trips
Forsythia Festival Crappie Tournament (March)

Popular culture
Dickey Betts of The Allman Brothers Band wrote an instrumental titled "High Falls", named after the park, that came out in 1975. The recording is 14½ minutes long.

Park information
The park is open from 7:00 a.m. to 10:00 p.m. and the office is open from 8 p.m. until 5 p.m.
The park is free for the community, parking is $5 and there are annual passes that can be purchased. The address to easily get to the park using your GPS is 76 High Falls Park Drive, Jackson, Georgia, 30233.

Images

References

External links
High Falls State Park
High Falls State Park Hiking

State parks of Georgia (U.S. state)
Protected areas of Monroe County, Georgia